This page shows the Azerbaijan national football team's results history:

Overview of results

International matches

Results

Record versus other countries

International goalscorers

All goalscorers from International Matches. Non-International Matches are not included.

12 goals

Gurban Gurbanov

9 goals

Vagif Javadov
Emin Mahmudov

8 goals

Dimitrij Nazarov
Ramil Sheydayev

7 goals

Rauf Aliyev

Elvin Mammadov

Branimir Subašić

6 goals

Zaur Tagizade

5 goals

Farrukh Ismayilov
Vidadi Rzayev

Rashad Sadygov
Afran Ismayilov

Nazim Suleymanov
Rufat Dadashov

4 goals

Ruslan Abushev
Samir Aliyev
Maksim Medvedev

Fabio Ramim
Yunis Huseynov
Vyacheslav Lychkin

Vugar Nadirov
Mahir Shukurov

3 goals

Rasim Abishov
Rahid Amirguliyev
Nadir Nabiev

Emin Quliyev
Tamkin Khalilzade

Richard Almeida
Araz Abdullayev

2 goals

Samir Alakbarov
Javid Huseynov

Ruslan Lukin
Mahir Emreli

Vadim Vasilyev
Mahir Madatov

1 goal

Emin Agaev
Andrezinho
Farid Guliyev
Tarlan Guliyev
Ilgar Gurbanov
Mahmud Qurbanov
Nizami Hajiyev
Murad Hüseynov
Ruslan İdiqov

Emin Imamaliev
Mirbaghir Isayev
Aslan Kerimov
Khagani Mammadov
Ramiz Mammadov
Cihan Özkara
Anatoli Ponomarev
Alim Qurbanov
Ruslan Qurbanov

Aghabala Ramazanov
Narvik Sirkhayev
Jeyhun Sultanov
Elvin Yunuszade
Zeynal Zeynalov
Urfan Abbasov
Javid Imamverdiyev
Badavi Huseynov
Azer Salahli

Own goal

Nugzar Lobzhanidze (25 May 1993 vs Georgia)

Giorgio Chiellini (10 October 2014 vs Italy)

Michele Cevoli (4 September 2017 vs San Marino)

Non-International matches

Notes

References

External links
Azerbaijan – List of International Matches – RSSSF.com
International Matches 1872-1880 and 1987-2004 Details – RSSSF.com (some statistics)
International Soccer Statistics – soccerpunter.com

 
Results
Results